The 2012 season in Swedish football, started in January 2012 and ended in December 2012.

Honours

Official titles

Competitions

Promotions, relegations and qualifications

Promotions

Relegations

International qualifications

Domestic results

2012 Allsvenskan

2012 Allsvenskan qualification play-offs

2012 Superettan

2012 Superettan qualification play-offs

2012 Division 1 Norra

2012 Division 1 Södra

2012 Supercupen 

Final

National team fixtures and results

Swedish clubs' performance in Europe
These are the results of the Swedish teams in European competitions during the 2012–13 season. (Swedish team score displayed first)

* For group games in Europa League, score in home game is displayed
** For group games in Europa League, score in away game is displayed

Notes

References 

 
Seasons in Swedish football